André Porthault (born 17 August 1941) is a French sports shooter. He competed in the men's 50 metre free pistol event at the 1976 Summer Olympics.

References

1941 births
Living people
French male sport shooters
Olympic shooters of France
Shooters at the 1976 Summer Olympics
Place of birth missing (living people)